SPR can refer to:

Media and entertainment
Self-Publishing Review, an online book review magazine for independent authors

Businesses and organizations
Sistema Público de Radiodifusión del Estado Mexicano, a Mexican public broadcaster
Society for Psychical Research, founded in 1882
Software Productivity Research, a software benchmarking company
Former São Paulo Railway Company, Brazil
Spirit AeroSystems, Wichita, Kansas, US, NYSE symbol
South Persia Rifles, British-commanded unit 1916-1921
Suruhanjaya Pilihan Raya Malaysia (Election Commission of Malaysia)

Places
San Pedro Airport, Belize. IATA code

Science and technology

Computer science
Subtree pruning and regrafting, a method in computational phylogenetics
Single particle reconstruction (or analysis), image processing techniques for transmission electron microscopy

Biology and medicine
SPR, a human gene which codes for the enzyme sepiapterin reductase
Specialist registrar (SpR), physician position in Ireland and formerly UK
Society for Psychotherapy Research

Weapons
FN Special Police Rifle, made by FN-Herstal
Mk 12 Special Purpose Rifle, US Navy weapon

Other uses in science and technology
Surface plasmon resonance of electrons

Other uses
Abbreviation of sapper, a military engineer
Strategic Petroleum Reserve (disambiguation) of various governments

See also

fi:SPR